Her Painted Hero is a short 1915 American film directed by F.Richard Jones and written by Mack Sennett.

Plot summary 

Her Painted Hero is about an heiress who plans to use her new wealth for influence on the stage. The play being shown within the film is entitled "What Sherman Said" a seeming epic about the Civil War.

Cast 
Hale Hamilton as a Matinee Idol
Charles Murray as a Property Man
Slim Summerville as a Bill-Poster
Polly Moran as a Stage-struck Maiden
Harry Booker as the Maiden's Father

Production

Whilst some sources credit production to the Keystone Film Company the logo clearly visible within the film is for the amalgamated company "Keystone Triangle", later to be abbreviated to Tri-stone Pictures.

External links 

1915 films
1915 comedy films
American silent short films
American black-and-white films
1915 short films
Silent American comedy films
American comedy short films
1910s American films